Hong Kong Rugby Union (HKRU) is the governing body for rugby union in Hong Kong. It was founded in 1952 and became affiliated to World Rugby (then known as the International Rugby Board) in 1988. It organises and oversees local rugby, including the annual Hong Kong Sevens tournament and the HKRU Premierships.

History 
In November 2022, Glory to Hong Kong was played after a match between the teams from South Korea and Hong Kong. The HKRU said "The HKRU expressed its extreme dissatisfaction at this occurrence and has received a full explanation of the circumstances that led to this. Whilst we accept this was a case of human error it was nevertheless not acceptable." Media reported that the local organizer had earlier asked each team for a copy of their anthems to play at the competition, but the Hong Kong team did not submit one.

Later in November 2022, the head of HKRU, Robbie McRobbie, said new rules that dictate athletes should correct organizers if the national anthem is played incorrectly were reasonable and practical.

See also
Hong Kong national rugby union team
Rugby union in Hong Kong

References

Rugby union in Hong Kong
Rugby union governing bodies in Asia
Rug
Sports organizations established in 1952
1952 establishments in Hong Kong